Somewhere Boy is a Channel 4 drama series filmed in South Wales, starring Lewis Gribben and written by Pete Jackson. It began airing on Channel 4 from 16 October 2022.

Filming locations include Cardiff and the Brecon Beacons.

Plot
The series focuses on teenager Danny, who since his mother's fatal accident, has been isolated from the outside world by his father. When Danny realises that monsters do not exist, like his father has claimed, he questions his entire existence.

Cast and characters
Lewis Gribben as Danny
Samuel Bottomley as Aaron
Rory Keenan as Steve
Lisa McGrillis as Sue
Johann Myers as Paul
Kieran Urquhart as Ash

Episodes

Reception
The series received positive reviews. Rebecca Nicholson in The Guardian gave the series a perfect five out of five stars. Anita Singh in The Telegraph also gave it five out of five stars, praising Gribben's performance and dubbing the show 'unforgettable'. Nick Hilton from the The Independent gave the first episode four out of five stars.

References

External links

2022 British television series debuts
2020s British crime drama television series
2020s British television miniseries
Television shows set in Wales
Channel 4 crime television shows
Channel 4 miniseries
Channel 4 television dramas
English-language television shows
Television series by Clerkenwell Films